Liangtian may refer to these places in China:

Liangtian Township, in Jiexi County, Guangdong
Liangtian Subdistrict, in Linwei District, Weinan, Shaanxi

Towns
Liangtian, Guangxi, in Luchuan County, Guangxi
Liangtian, Guizhou, in Zhenning Buyei and Miao Autonomous County, Guizhou
Liangtian, Hunan, in Chenzhou, Hunan
Liangtian, Ningxia, in Yinchuan, Ningxia